Mostafa Khan Mesbahzadeh (August 18, 1908 – December 25, 2006) was an Iranian journalist and member of the Senate of Iran. Together with Abdolrahman Faramarzi, he co-founded the newspaper Kayhan.

Background
Mostafa Mesbahzadeh was born on 18 November 1908 in Shiraz. He was one of the students sent to Europe by the Iranian government during the reign of Reza Shah Pahlavi. He returned to Iran after obtaining a doctorate in criminal law from Sorbonne University in 1936 and began teaching at the University of Tehran.

In 1931, Mesbahzadeh founded Kayhan with the help of Mohammad Reza Shah Pahlavi.

Two years before the fall of the monarchy and the subsequent establishment of the Islamic Republic, Mostafa Mesbahzadeh left Iran and practically handed over the management of the newspaper to his son, Iraj.

After the revolution, the Kayhan newspaper was confiscated by the revolutionary government; Mesbahzadeh, who was living in London at the time, gathered a number of writers and journalists who had fled the country to publish a weekly newspaper called Kayhan-in-exile; it was later known as Kayhan London. 

After a long period of illness, Mostefa Mesbahzadeh died on 25 November 2006 in San Diego.

References

Bibliography

1908 births
2006 deaths
Iranian journalists
Iranian politicians
20th-century Iranian people
People of Pahlavi Iran
University of Paris alumni
Academic staff of the University of Tehran